Pokegama Lake is the name used for two lakes in the U.S. state of Minnesota.

One is located near Grand Rapids in Itasca County.  The lake was made into a reservoir by the construction of the Pokegama Lake Dam on the Mississippi River in Cohasset, Minnesota.

The other Pokegama is located near Pine City in Pine County. Pokegama is a name derived from the Ojibwe language Bakegamaa meaning "the water which juts off from another water,"   which describes the lake's connection to the Snake River.

See also
List of lakes in Minnesota

References

Lakes of Minnesota
Lakes of Pine County, Minnesota